Zawiyet Sidi Brahim Boushaki or Zawiyet Thénia is a zawiya of the Rahmaniyya Sufi brotherhood located in Boumerdès Province within lower Kabylia of Algeria.

Construction
The zawiya of Soumâa was built in 1442 in the Col des Beni Aïcha within the south-east heights of the current town of Boumerdès within the Kabylia region.

The founder of this Sufi school is the great scholar Sidi Brahim bin Faïd al-Boushaki (1394–1453), who established this zawiya of education, which served as a beacon for the people of the Khachna mountains region, and its scientific and light rays extend to the outskirts of the homeland.

Missions
The zawiya of Sidi Brahim Boushaki in Thala Oufella (Soumâa) village was considered a prominent religious teacher in memorizing and indoctrinating the Quran and its basic rulings for young people and providing the various mosques of lower Kabylia during the month of Ramadan every year with a preservation that leads to Tarawih prayers by reciting the Quran with the Warsh recitation.

This zawiya, which opened its doors in 1442, had an important place in its fields of formation, as it had annually graduated several Hafiz of the Quran with its rulings and the Hadith that he depends on in framing the various mosques of the region around Meraldene River.

It was a place to study and teach the Quran, as well as providing aid to the needy and those about to get married and organizing circumcision ceremonies.

It was one of the Zawiyas in Algeria that played an important role in social life in Thénia region, and it was considered as a Sufi zawiya, as it was based on the traditional way of teaching the Qur’an and Sunnah as well.

The learner (talibe) intended to write the verses by himself using the traditional ink, which is a special ink that the learner makes from sheep's wool, where he melts it on fire until it becomes black, then mixes it with water, and the characteristic of this ink is that it does not disappear from the written tablet except by rubbing it with clay and water.

Location
This zawiya is located on the mountain which is part of the Tell Atlas and which houses the village of Soumâa at an altitude of 410 meters in the Col des Beni Aïcha.

It is thus perched in the northeast of the Khachna Massif which overhangs Oued Meraldene and Oued Isser in the lower Kabylia, and is located to the east of the plain of Issers.

Sufism

The period of the 15th Gregorian century which saw the establishment of this zawiya on the heights of the Col des Beni Aïcha coincided with the spread of the Sufi and mystical tariqa of the Qadiriyya in Mitidja and Kabylia.

This is how the talibe who presented himself for the ascetic and transcendent initiation in this Sunni zawiya had to follow a spiritual path based on the dhikr, the wird and the wazifa to put his foot on the path of the murids and the saliks.

The marabouts and muqaddams who oversaw this zawiya worked to initiate each hafiz and qari who frequented this institution to become a wasil and a rabbani.

This religious establishment was not content only to instill the rudiments of religious knowledge in the disciples, but it aimed to raise their spiritual rank to reach the heights of qutb, siddiq and wali.

And with the advent of the Rahmaniyya tariqa in Algeria during the 18th century, the zawiya of Sidi Boushaki joined this brotherhood of Khalwatiyya and then adapted its initiatory program to the precepts of this ascetic mode.

Teachings
Several Islamic sciences were taught in this zawiya followinل the Rahmaniyya Sufi brotherhood, as the Hadith which is taught on the basis of Al-Muwatta compiled by Imam Malik ibn Anas. This is how the fiqh according to the Malikite Madhhab was observed in the courts of this Algerian zawiya which is based on the body of the Mukhtasar Khalil written by Khalil ibn Ishaq al-Jundi.

Another reference of the Malikite fiqh dispensed in this zawiya is the Risala fiqhiya written by Ibn Abi Zayd al-Qayrawani, and a third Malikite fiqh reference inculcated in this zawiya is Matn Ibn Ashir written by Abdul Wahid Ibn Ashir.

The Arabic language was taught on the basis of the text of the Al-Alfiyya of Ibn Malik composed by Ibn Malik, and the syntax of the Arabic language was taught on the basis of the text of the Al-Ajurrumiyya composed by Ibn Adjurrum.

The teaching of this same syntax was based on the text of Qatr al-Nada composed by Ibn Hisham al-Ansari.

French conquest of Algeria

This zawiya has been at the center of the Algerian resistance of the Kabyles of the Col des Beni Aïcha since 1830 against the French invasion of Algeria, and has participated through its murids in several decisive battles, including:
 Shipwreck of Dellys (1830)
 Raid on Reghaïa (1837)
 Battle of the Col des Beni Aïcha (1837)
 Battle of Boudouaou (1837)
 Battle of the Issers (1837)
 Battle of the Col des Beni Aïcha (1846)
 Battle of the Col des Beni Aïcha (1871)
 Battle of Boudouaou (1871)

Visit of Emir Abdelkader

During the visit of the Emir Abdelkader in 1839 to Kabylia, he made a stay in Dellys where he went to visit the Zawiyet Sidi Amar Cherif in the mountain of Bouberrak and had lunch there before going to spend at night with the Issers tribe.

During this visit to the Issers, the Emir also went to Zawiyet Sidi Boumerdassi near EI-Djebil and then continued his journey by going to the Col des Beni Aïcha where he was warmly received by the marabouts of Zawiyet Sidi Boushaki.

He was well received by the descendants of the theologian Sidi Boushaki and gunshots were fired as a sign of rejoicing for his reassuring presence, then a meal of hospitality of distinguished inivities was prepared for him thinking that he was going to spend the night at home, but at nightfall he left to sleep elsewhere to create a diversion among the possible spies of colonial France.

Before leaving the village of Soumâa, Emir Abdelkader had announced to the inhabitants that peace with the French was fragile and would soon be broken at any time.

Algerian Revolution

During the Algerian independence revolution, this zawiya was completely involved in the fight for the freedom of the country, and thus the chahid Yahia Boushaki (1935-1960) was one of the emblematic figures of the revolution in the Historic Wilaya IV.

The zawiya continued to supervise the mosques in the villages of the Col des Beni Aïcha by providing them with imams to maintain the practice of Muslim worship (Ibadah) in these warlike circumstances.

This is how the mosque in the village of Aït Hamadouche had previously been framed by an imam of the zawiya, and the same with the villages of Djenah, Fekhara, Itoubal and Zaatra, before the whole region was devastated after the Soummam conference on 20 August 1956 by the reprisals of the French Army.

The village of Soumâa was destroyed by French colonial artillery during the month of April 1957, and the zawiya was razed by shell fire which buried several mujahideen who were sheltering in its premises.

Several murids of this zawiya were sequestered in the torture center of Ferme Gauthier near Oued Isser where several of them suffered the most formidable pangs and others died.

Notable people

 Sidi Boushaki (1394-1453)
 Ali Boushaki (1855-1965)
 Mohamed Seghir Boushaki (1869-1959)
 Abderrahmane Boushaki (1896-1985)
 Brahim Boushaki (1912-1997)
 Yahia Boushaki (1935-1960)
 Mohamed Rahmoune (1940-2022)
 Cheikh Ali Boushaki (1812-1846)
 Cheikh Mohamed Boushaki (1834-1884)

Gallery

See also

 Algerian Islamic reference
 Sufism in Algeria
 Zawiyas in Algeria
 Qadiriyya
 Rahmaniyya
 Soumâa
 Meraldene
 Tabrahimt
 Gueddara
 Sidi Boushaki
 French conquest of Algeria
 Shipwreck of Dellys (1830)
 Battle of the Col des Beni Aïcha (1837)
 Battle of the Col des Beni Aïcha (1846)
 Mokrani Revolt
 Battle of the Col des Beni Aïcha (1871)
 Battle of Boudouaou (1871)
 Maximilien Joseph Schauenburg
 Jean-François Gentil
 Thomas Robert Bugeaud
 Algerian Revolution

External links

References

Sidi Boushaki
1442 establishments
Sufism in Algeria
Zawiyas in Algeria
Buildings and structures in Boumerdès Province
15th-century establishments in Africa
Boushaki family
Zawiyet Sidi Boushaki
Islamic architecture
Islamic education in Algeria
Education in Algeria
Educational organisations based in Algeria
Islamic education